Abel Richard Kiviat (June 23, 1892 – August 24, 1991) was an American middle-distance runner. He was the oldest living American Olympic medalist at the time of his death. He competed for and coached the Irish American Athletic Club, and was later a member of the New York Athletic Club.

Biography
Kiviat was born to Zelda and Morris (sometimes written as Milton or Moshe) Kiviat. He was raised on Staten Island and attended Curtis High School. He joined the Irish American Athletic Club in New York City and started training in 1908.

In 1908 at Travers Island, he won the Junior Championship for one mile for the Metropolitan District, making the fast time of 4:24. In the same year he won the Baxter Cup in the Columbia University races at Madison Square Garden, making the fast time of 4:23 2–5. He broke the world's record in the 2,400 yard relay race, his time for his 600 yards being 1:16, and 5:4 for the entire distance. He also won the Canadian mile championship in 1909 and again in 1910."

He set a 1500 meter world record of 3:55.8 minutes in Cambridge, Massachusetts, in June 1912. In 1912, he set the world record for 1500 meters three times in 15 days; during the third effort, Harvard stadium was sold out with 15,000 in attendance – referenced in "The Milers" by Cordner Nelson. He competed for the U.S. Olympic Team, as a member of the Irish American Athletic Club, and won a silver medal in the 1500 m at the Olympic Games in Stockholm 1912 (the gold was won by Arnold Jackson). For the first time, the Olympics used a photo finish to determine who won the medal. In Stockholm he also raced on the gold-medal US team in the 3000 m relay, and competed for the US team in the exhibition baseball tournament. During the trip to Sweden in 1912 he was cabin mates with Jim Thorpe, a much renowned Native American athlete.

In 1984, Kiviat, who was Jewish, was inducted into the International Jewish Sports Hall of Fame, and in 1985, he was inducted into the USA Track & Field Hall of Fame.

He died of prostate cancer on August 24, 1991, in Lakehurst, New Jersey. Aged 99, he was the oldest living Olympian.

Legacy

The Abel R. Kiviat Memorial race is held annually at his alma mater, Curtis High School, in Staten Island, New York.

See also
List of select Jewish track and field athletes
Staten Island Sports Hall of Fame

Notes

References

External links

 
 Winged Fist Organization
 Abel Kiviat – "Hebrew Runner" of the I-AAC

1892 births
1991 deaths
American male middle-distance runners
Baseball players from New York (state)
Deaths from cancer in New Jersey
Deaths from prostate cancer
Olympic baseball players of the United States
Athletes (track and field) at the 1912 Summer Olympics
Baseball players at the 1912 Summer Olympics
Olympic gold medalists for the United States in track and field
Olympic silver medalists for the United States in track and field
Sportspeople from Staten Island
Jewish American sportspeople
Jewish male athletes (track and field)
World record setters in athletics (track and field)
People from Manhattan
People from Lakehurst, New Jersey
Curtis High School alumni
Track and field athletes from New Jersey
Sportspeople from Ocean County, New Jersey
Medalists at the 1912 Summer Olympics
Track and field athletes from New York City
20th-century American Jews